Kuntsevskaya is a station on the Bolshaya Koltsevaya line of the Moscow Metro. It was opened on 7 December 2021 as part of the section between Mnyovniki and Kakhovskaya. A transfer to Kuntsevskaya is also planned.

Gallery

References

Moscow Metro stations
Bolshaya Koltsevaya line
Railway stations located underground in Russia
Railway stations under construction in Russia